Stelle is a municipality in the district of Harburg, in Lower Saxony, Germany. It is situated approximately 20 km southeast of Hamburg, and 7 km west of Winsen (Luhe). It is twinned with the village of Glenfield in Leicestershire, England and with the village of Plouzané (Brittany, France).

References

Harburg (district)